David S. Hall (23 July 1905 – 23 July 1964) was a British art director. He was nominated for two Academy Awards in the category Best Art Direction.

Selected filmography
Hall was nominated for two Academy Awards for Best Art Direction:
 Wee Willie Winkie (1937)
 The Greatest Story Ever Told (1965)

References

External links

1905 births
1964 deaths
British art directors